Malaco is a Swedish brand of confectionery products owned by Cloetta. Their products are sold in Sweden, Norway, Denmark, Finland, the US, Israel and the Netherlands among others.  Products include Brio, Fruxo, Pim Pim,Swedish Fish, Djungelvrål, Gott & Blandat,  and Malaco Crazy Face.

References

External links 
 

Brand name confectionery
Swedish brands